Philippus Albertus Borman Snyman (born 26 March 1987) is a South African rugby union footballer. He is the current captain of South Africa's National Rugby 7s Team, Blitzbokke. He also plays as a centre or winger for the Cheetahs in both Super Rugby and the Currie Cup.

He was a member of the South African Sevens team that won a bronze medal at the 2016 Summer Olympics.

Career

Super Rugby

Snyman replaced Andries Strauss who was suspended for a dangerous tackle on Lions Lock Wikus van Heerden in 2012.

Sevens

He made his sevens debut for the Blitzbokke at the 2008 Dubai Sevens. He returned for the final two legs of the series in a bid to clinch the 2008–09 IRB Sevens World Series title, which South Africa eventually won.

Snyman signed a two-year contract with the South African Sevens team from 2012 until 2014. In 2013, he was included in the squad for the 2013 Rugby World Cup Sevens. Snyman suffered a knee ligament injury at the 2015 Hong Kong Sevens and was replaced by newcomer Carel du Preez for the rest of the series.

2016 Summer Olympics

Snyman was included in a 12-man squad for the 2016 Summer Olympics in Rio de Janeiro. He was named in the starting line-up for their first match in Group B of the competition against Spain, scoring a try as South Africa won the match 24–0.

References

External links
 
 
 
 
 
 

Living people
1987 births
South African rugby union players
Rugby union centres
Cheetahs (rugby union) players
Free State Cheetahs players
Sportspeople from Bloemfontein
Afrikaner people
University of the Free State alumni
South Africa international rugby sevens players
Rugby sevens players at the 2016 Summer Olympics
Olympic rugby sevens players of South Africa
Olympic bronze medalists for South Africa
Olympic medalists in rugby sevens
Medalists at the 2016 Summer Olympics
Rugby sevens players at the 2018 Commonwealth Games